Gedichte im Exil is a 1937 collection of lyric poems by the German author Bertolt Brecht, on the subject of his exile from Germany after the Nazis took power. It was adapted for the stage as Conversations in Exile by the English playwright Howard Brenton in 1987.

References

Sources 
 
 

1937 books
German poetry collections